Charles Frederick Reiner (15 February 1884 – 9 January 1947) was an English first-class cricketer active 1906–08 who played for Surrey. He was born in Sutton, Surrey; died in Maida Vale.

References

1884 births
1947 deaths
English cricketers
Surrey cricketers
W. G. Grace's XI cricketers